Papa A.P. (born on January 6, 1982, in Chalatenango, Chalatenango, El Salvador) is a singer and producer of reggaeton. His biggest hits are his cover version of "Gasolina" and "Entre tu y yo (entre toi et moi)" (featuring Linda), released in 2005. He has eight brothers and sisters.

Discography

Albums

Singles

References

21st-century Salvadoran male singers
1982 births
Living people
Reggaeton musicians